Rodolfo Cardoso may refer to:
Rodolfo Tan Cardoso (1937–2013), Filipino chessmaster
Rodolfo Cardoso (footballer, born 1968), Argentine former footballer who played as a midfielder
Rodolfo Cardoso (footballer, born 1997), Portuguese footballer who plays as a goalkeeper